Mercédès Adrienne Ramona Manuela Jellinek (16 September 1889 – 23 February 1929) was the daughter of Austrian automobile entrepreneur Emil Jellinek and his first wife Rachel Goggmann Cenrobert. She was born in Vienna. She is best known for her father having Daimler-Motoren-Gesellschaft's line of Mercedes cars named after her, beginning with the Mercedes 35 hp model of 1901.

In addition, her father hung a large picture of her at the 1902 Paris Automobile exhibition. He even legally changed his name to Jellinek-Mercedes in 1903 after Daimler-Motoren-Gesellschaft registered Mercedes as a trademark in 1902. Mercedes is a Spanish feminine name meaning mercy.

Biography 
Jellinek lived in Vienna, and married twice. She had an elaborate wedding in 1909 in Nice, on the French Riviera, with Baron von Schlosser. The couple lived in Vienna until World War I, which ruined them. They had two children; Elfriede (b. 1912) and Hans-Peter (b. 1916). In 1918, she was begging for food in the streets. A little later, leaving her husband and two children, she married Baron Rudolf von Weigl, a talented, but poor, sculptor. She played music and had a good soprano voice. She never shared her father's passion for automobiles. 

Jellinek died in Vienna, from bone cancer, in 1929, at the age of 39, and was buried in Vienna in the family grave near her grandfather, the former chief rabbi of Vienna, Adolf Jellinek. In 1926, Daimler merged with Benz & Cie; although the company traded as Daimler-Benz, it gave the name "Mercedes-Benz" to its cars to preserve the respected Mercedes brand.

References

External links 
 

1889 births
1929 deaths
Austrian children
Austrian Jews
Austrian people of Czech-Jewish descent
Deaths from bone cancer
Mercedes-Benz
Musicians from Vienna